American rapper Eminem has released 57 singles as a lead artist and nine promotional singles. He has also featured in 22 singles as a guest artist, while entering the charts with over 100 additional songs.

Eminem's debut single, "Just Don't Give a Fuck", was released in 1998 and was included in Slim Shady EP, as well as in his second studio album, The Slim Shady LP, which featured a re-worked version of the song. Eminem's first song to enter the Billboard Hot 100 was "My Name Is", which was released in 1999 and became the most successful single from The Slim Shady LP. It and "Guilty Conscience" both reached the top 5 in the UK.

The lead single from Eminem's third studio album, The Marshall Mathers LP, was the song "The Real Slim Shady", which became his first entry in the top ten of the Billboard Hot 100. The third single from the album, "Stan", featured vocals from British singer Dido, sampled from her song "Thank You". "Stan" was the album's most successful single outside of the States, while it failed to reach the top 50 in Eminem's home country.

In 2002, Eminem released the singles "Without Me" and "Cleanin' Out My Closet" from his album The Eminem Show, as well as the single "Lose Yourself" from the 8 Mile soundtrack, which became his first number one song on the Hot 100 and remained on the top for 12 weeks. The song also reached the top of various national charts worldwide.

In 2009, the song "Crack a Bottle", a collaboration with label-mates Dr. Dre and 50 Cent, became Eminem's second number one on the Hot 100 and broke the record for opening week download sales in the US, with 418,000 copies sold in the first week.

Recoverys singles "Not Afraid" and "Love the Way You Lie" featuring Rihanna, both released in 2010, became Eminem's third and fourth number one songs on the Hot 100; the latter also reached the top of various national charts worldwide. In June 2014, his song "Not Afraid" was diamond certified by the RIAA, thus making Eminem the first artist with two digital diamond awards by RIAA.

In August 2013, Eminem released the single "Berzerk" which debuted number 3 on the Billboard Hot 100 and preceded his eighth studio album The Marshall Mathers LP 2. The album spawned the singles "Survival", which was showcased during the Call of Duty: Ghosts reveal trailer, "Rap God", and "The Monster" featuring Rihanna. "The Monster" became Eminem's fifth No. 1 single on the Hot 100, tying him with rappers Ludacris and P. Diddy for rappers with the most No. 1 singles in the US. In May 2014, Eminem was announced as the most-streamed artist of all time on Spotify.

From 2017 to 2020, Eminem released various hit singles, including "River" featuring Ed Sheeran, "Lucky You" featuring Joyner Lucas, "Killshot", and "Godzilla" featuring Juice Wrld. The latter two debuted at number 3 on the Billboard Hot 100.

As lead artist

As featured artist

Promotional singles

Other charted and certified songs

Other guest appearances

See also
 Eminem albums discography
 Eminem production discography
 Bad Meets Evil discography
 D12 discography

Notes

References

Discography
Discographies of American artists
Hip hop discographies